FCZ may refer to:
 FC Z, a Swedish television series
 Fussballclub Zürich, a Swiss football club
 FCZ: an EEG electrode site according to the 10-20 system